William Asprey (born 11 September 1936) is an English former football player and manager. A defender, he made 418 league appearances in a 15-year career in the Football League. He then had a 25-year career as a coach.

He spent 1953 to 1965 at Stoke City, making 341 appearances in all competitions. He helped the "Potters" to the Second Division title in 1962–63, and also played in the 1964 League Cup final. He spent 1965 to December 1967 at Oldham Athletic, before he was sold to Port Vale for a £2,000 fee. He left the "Valiants" in December 1968 to become a full-time coach.

He coached at various clubs across the world, as well as the national teams of Rhodesia and Syria, but was given his first chance as a manager in England at Oxford United in July 1979. He was not overly successful, and was sacked in December 1980. He returned to Stoke City as manager in December 1983, but was sacked in April 1985 after leading the club to the bottom of the First Division.

Playing career

Stoke City
Born in Wolverhampton, Asprey joined Stoke City on amateur terms in May 1953. He made his first team debut in the 1953–54 season under the management of Frank Taylor after turning professional at the age of 17. He played a further three Second Division games in 1955–56, before making nine appearances in 1956–57, and then breaking into the first team with 28 appearances in 1957–58. He scored his first senior goal on 9 September 1957, in a 5–3 home defeat to Bristol Rovers. He made 44 appearances in the 1958–59 campaign, scoring six goals, including one in a 4–3 win over Liverpool at Anfield. During the campaign he played at five different positions: right-back, right-half, centre-half, inside-right and inside-left. He played 38 times in 1959–60, before new manager Tony Waddington began to play him in an attacking role in 1960–61. During the campaign he scored seven goals in 40 games, scoring twice in a 9–0 thrashing of Plymouth Argyle, and hitting a hat-trick past Charlton Athletic in a 5–3 home win on 16 January 1961. He made 47 appearances in 1961–62, scoring four goals.

The "Potters" were crowned champions of the Second Division in 1962–63, and Asprey was a vital part of the club's success, making 44 appearances in league and cup competitions. He was limited to 29 First Division appearances in 1963–64, but managed to pick up a League Cup runners-up medal. In the first leg of the final, his 30-yard shot was parried by Leicester City goalkeeper Gordon Banks, and Keith Bebbington put the loose ball into the net. Stoke drew 1–1 at the Victoria Ground, but lost the encounter at Filbert Street 3–2. Asprey posted 43 appearances in 1964–65, but featured just twice in 1965–66. In total he played 341 league and cup games for the club.

Oldham Athletic
Asprey moved on to Oldham Athletic, after former Stoke teammate turned newly appointed Oldham manager Jimmy McIlroy purchased him for a £19,000 fee in January 1966. Oldham finished the 1965–66 season just one place and one point above the Third Division relegation zone. The "Latics" rose to tenth in 1966–67 in McIlroy's first full season as manager. In all, Asprey made 83 league appearances during his time at Boundary Park.

Port Vale
Asprey was purchased by Port Vale for a £2,000 fee in December 1967. He made 22 Fourth Division appearances under "Valiants" manager (and former Stoke teammate) Stanley Matthews in 1967–68, but featured just eleven times in 1968–69 under new boss Gordon Lee. He departed Vale Park when he retired as a player in December 1968, at the age of 32.

Style of play
Asprey was versatile, and appeared in almost every outfield position for Stoke. He made most of his appearances at full-back, despite his tall and heavy frame ( and 12 stone). He was noted for his tough tackling ability.

Coaching career
After retiring from playing, Asprey joined Sheffield Wednesday's coaching staff in February 1969. In February 1970 he joined Coventry City as Noel Cantwell's assistant. In a training session at Highfield Road he came up with the idea of the famous donkey-kick free-kick routine that was executed by Willie Carr and scored by Ernie Hunt in a league game against Everton in October 1970. This was immediately outlawed due to the fact the ball was touched twice.

In 1972, he joined Don Howe at West Bromwich Albion and later coached at Wolverhampton Wanderers, before taking charge of the Rhodesian National Team from May 1975 to January 1978. He was appointed manager of Oxford United in July 1979, and led the club to 17th in the Third Division in 1979–80. He was sacked in December 1980, and Oxford finished the 1980–81 season in 14th place under the stewardship of Ian Greaves.

In December 1980, Asprey was appointed as coach to the Syria national team. He returned to Stoke City as assistant manager to Richie Barker in February 1982, whom he succeeded in December 1983. Initially successful in keeping Stoke from relegation in 1983–84, his transfer dealings left the Potters unable to compete in the 1984–85 season, and he was sacked in April, with the club bottom of the First Division with just three wins all season. Financial constraints however had left him without an assistant, trainer or physiotherapist at the start of the season.

After a break from football, he took the Olympic Team Position in Iraq, leaving prior to the Gulf War, in 1990. He joined the Malaysian team ATM later that year and then moved on to coach in Bahrain. In 1993, Asprey retired from football and moved to Jersey.

Career statistics

Managerial statistics
Source:

Honours
Stoke City
Football League Second Division: 1962–63
League Cup runner-up: 1964

References

Footballers from Wolverhampton
English footballers
Association football defenders
Stoke City F.C. players
Oldham Athletic A.F.C. players
Port Vale F.C. players
English Football League players
English football managers
English expatriate football managers
Expatriate football managers in Zimbabwe
Zimbabwe national football team managers
Oxford United F.C. managers
Expatriate football managers in Syria
English expatriate sportspeople in Syria
Syria national football team managers
Stoke City F.C. managers
English Football League managers
Association football coaches
Sheffield Wednesday F.C. non-playing staff
Coventry City F.C. non-playing staff
West Bromwich Albion F.C. non-playing staff
Wolverhampton Wanderers F.C. non-playing staff
Stoke City F.C. non-playing staff
1936 births
Living people